Edwyn ap Gwriad was a Welsh king of Gwent from 1015 to 1045.  He was imprisoned and blinded by his successor, Meurig ap Hywel, the son of Hywel ab Owain.
The Anglo-Saxon name "Edwyn" along with Gwent's proximity to the English marches seems to imply some degree of relationship with early English rulers of the time.

External links

Year of birth missing
Year of death missing
Monarchs of Gwent
11th-century Welsh monarchs